Wing House may refer to:

Wing House Museum, Coldwater, Michigan
Andrews-Wing House, Boonville, Missouri
Tabor-Wing House, Dover Plains, New York
Helen Wing House, Glen Falls, New York
Asa and Caroline Wing House, Mexico, New York
Brown-Wing House, Bloomfield Township, Trumbull County, Ohio, listed on the National Register of Historic Places
Wing Fort House, East Sandwich, Massachusetts

See also
747 Wing House
The WingHouse Bar & Grill